Freaky Friday is a 1972 children's book by Mary Rodgers.

Freaky Friday may also refer to:

 The Freaky Friday franchise based on the novel by Mary Rodgers, and produced by The Walt Disney Company; including:
 Freaky Friday (1976), a theatrical film starring Jodie Foster and Barbara Harris.
 Disney's Freaky Friday (1995), a television film adaptation that aired on American Broadcasting Company (ABC), starring Gaby Hoffmann and Shelley Long.
 Freaky Friday (2003), a theatrical contemporary-remake film starring Lindsay Lohan and Jamie Lee Curtis.
 Freaky Friday: Original Soundtrack, the official soundtrack album of the 2003 film.
 Freaky Friday: The Musical, a Broadway musical theatre production, adapted from and based on the book, as well as the 1976 and 2003 films.
 Freaky Friday (2018), a television film adaptation of the musical stage production that aired on Disney Channel, starring Heidi Blickenstaff and Cozi Zuehlsdorff.

 "Freaky Friday" (song), a 2018 song by American rapper Lil Dicky featuring Chris Brown
 "Freaky Friday", a 2000 song by the Danish pop band Aqua from Aquarius
 "Freaky Friday" (stock markets), another name for the triple witching hour, describing the increased stock volatility for certain days